Oleksandr Shapoval (9 February 1975 – 12 September 2022) was a Ukrainian ballet dancer and choreographer with the National Opera of Ukraine. He volunteered to serve in the Ukrainian military after the 2022 Russian invasion of Ukraine, and was killed in battle near Mayorsk, Donetsk Oblast, on 12 September 2022, aged 47. 

He was an Honoured Artist of Ukraine.

References

1975 births
2022 deaths
Dancers from Kyiv
Military personnel from Kyiv
Ukrainian choreographers
Ukrainian male ballet dancers
Ukrainian military personnel killed in the 2022 Russian invasion of Ukraine